Midwest Young Artists Conservatory (MYAC) is a youth music and jazz organization based near Chicago, Illinois. It is the largest youth ensemble music program in the Midwest.

MYAC was founded in 1993 in Evanston, Illinois by Dr. Allan Dennis and consisted of a single orchestra. Since then, MYAC has grown considerably; it now includes six youth symphony orchestras, 65+ chamber ensembles, a jazz and big band program, four choral groups, and an entry level early childhood music program for very young children.

MYAC also has a sizable chamber music program. The organization is based at the MYAC Center in Fort Sheridan in Highwood, Illinois. Enrollment is around 1000 student musicians from 78 cities throughout the Chicago metropolitan area.

MYAC performances are held at Harris Theater and Jay Pritzker Pavilion in Millennium Park, Symphony Center in Chicago, Pick-Staiger Auditorium at Northwestern University, the Ravinia Festival and the Hot House jazz facility. In 2007, Midwest Young Artists Conservatory became the first youth orchestra ever to perform at the Civic Opera House in Chicago. Each year, Midwest Young Artists Conservatory hosts the Walgreens National Concerto Competition, for young soloists, and the Discover National Chamber Music Competition, for young string, brass, percussion and wind ensembles.

In March 2019, MYAC was named the 2019 Youth Orchestra of the Year by the Illinois Council of Orchestras, the fourth time in the organization's 30-year history.

Ensembles

Midwest Young Artists Conservatory has six principal orchestras, ranked by skill level and age:
Reading Orchestra
Cadet Orchestra
Concertino Orchestra
Philharmonia Orchestra
Concert Orchestra
Symphony Orchestra

MYAC has four main jazz ensembles, as well as a number of smaller jazz combos.
Big Band
Jazz Orchestra
Jazz Workshop
Jazz Ensemble

MYAC has 4 choral ensembles
Mini Maestros
Mighty Maestros
Voices Rising
Vocal Point

External links
Midwest Young Artists Conservatory
MYAC Summer Music Programs
Midwest Young Artists Conservatory News
Midwest Young Artists Conservatory on YouTube
Midwest Young Artists Conservatory on SoundCloud

American youth orchestras
Classical music in the United States
Musical groups established in 1993
Music organizations based in the United States
Music schools in Illinois
Highwood, Illinois
Education in Evanston, Illinois
Orchestras based in Illinois
1993 establishments in Illinois
Youth organizations based in Illinois
Articles containing video clips